Raymond Ernest Watts (September 18, 1895 – June 3, 1969) was an American football, basketball and baseball coach.  He served as a head coach in three different sports at Baldwin–Wallace College–now known as Baldwin Wallace University—in Berea, Ohio between 1928 and 1948.
Watts was the head football coach at Otterbein University in 1919.

Head coaching record

College football

References

External links
 

1895 births
1969 deaths
Baldwin Wallace Yellow Jackets athletic directors
Baldwin Wallace Yellow Jackets baseball coaches
Baldwin Wallace Yellow Jackets football coaches
Baldwin Wallace Yellow Jackets men's basketball coaches
Basketball coaches from Ohio
Otterbein Cardinals football coaches
Otterbein Cardinals men's basketball coaches
Otterbein University alumni
People from Powell, Ohio
People from Westerville, Ohio
Players of American football from Ohio